Kyst og Fjord (Coast and Fjord) is a Norwegian fishermen's newspaper based in Kjøllefjord. 

The newspaper is published weekly and was launched in fall 2011. After its first full year of operation, Kyst og Fjord attained a circulation of 1,312. Kyst og Fjord also issues an online newspaper that is updated daily with news from the seafood industry. The newspaper has local offices in Tromsø and Sortland. The newspaper is a member of the National Association of Local Newspapers. The paper's editor and general manager is Øystein Ingilæ.

Circulation
According to the Norwegian Media Businesses' Association, Kyst og Fjord has had the following annual circulation:
 2012: 1,312
 2013: 1,536
 2014: 1,824
 2015: 1,765
 2016: 1,702

References

External links
Kyst og Fjord homepage

Weekly newspapers published in Norway
Norwegian-language newspapers
Mass media in Finnmark
Publications established in 2011
2011 establishments in Norway